"Walk Me to the Bridge" is the first single released by the Manic Street Preachers from the album Futurology. The single was planned for release on 28 April 2014, but it was leaked earlier in the month.

Background

In an interview about the song's lyrics, bass player Nicky Wire approached the topic of whether the song was about former band member, Richey Edwards or not, Wire stated that: 
People might have the idea that this song contains a lot of Richey references but it really isn’t about that, it's about the Øresund Bridge that joins Sweden and Denmark. A long time ago when we were crossing that bridge I was flagging and thinking about leaving the band (the "fatal friend"). It's about the idea of bridges allowing you an out of body experience as you leave and arrive in different places.

The band, especially Wire, have stated that he wrote the song at a critical time, when he was, as described above, tired of being in the band, and he wrote the lyrics thinking of that subject. He later felt differently after a gig in Denmark.

Release

The song was released as a digital download and it was backed by two new songs The Sound of Detachment and Caldey, it also featured a live version of the title song and a reworking of "Futurology", album track, Europa Geht Durch Mich.

Music video

In an interview Nicky Wire said that he wanted Kieran Evans for the music video. The band tried to continue the narrative element that the two previous singles from Rewind the Film had. It was inspired by the film Run Lola Run and the video was released to the public on 27 April.

Track listing

Personnel 

 Manic Street Preachers

 James Dean Bradfield – lead vocals, guitar
 Nicky Wire – bass guitar
 Sean Moore – drums

Other personnel

 Loz Williams - production
 Alex Silva - production
 Kieran Evans - music video

Charts

References

External links
 Lyrics at SongMeanings.net

Manic Street Preachers songs
2014 songs
2014 singles
Songs written by James Dean Bradfield
Songs written by Nicky Wire
Songs written by Sean Moore (musician)